Hydrothassa is a genus of Chrysomelinae (a subfamily of leaf beetles). It is sometimes treated as a subgenus of Prasocuris.

Species
H. fairmairei (Brisout de Bameville, 1866)
H. flavocincta (Brulle, 1832)
H. glabra (Herbst, 1783)
H. hannoveriana (Fabricius, 1775)
H. marginella (Linnaeus, 1758)
H. oblongiuscula (Fairmaire, 1884)
H. suffriani (Küster, 1852)

Gallery

References

External links
 Key to identifying larvae of ''Hydrothassa'
 Images of some Hydrothassa species at BugGuide.net

Chrysomelidae genera
Chrysomelinae
Taxa named by Carl Gustaf Thomson